Persicula multilineata is a species of sea snail, a marine gastropod mollusk, in the family Cystiscidae.

References

Multilineata
Gastropods described in 1846
Cystiscidae